Infinity Limited is an Australian science education television series produced by the ABC in Melbourne between 1982 and 1984. Despite the show's short run, it proved popular with primary school kids around Australia. 37 episodes were made. Each episode was broadcast between 12 and 19 times from 1982 to 1991, with the exception of episode 83/9 "The Big Heater" which was only broadcast three times between 1982 and 1983.

The show initially starred Kim Trengove and Stefan Dennis as Kris (Kristal) and Rick who run a small business called Infinity Ltd. Dennis left the show after 20 episodes in late 1983 and was replaced by Mark Little as Rosco for the final 17 episodes. Infinity Ltd. were generally called upon to solve basic science-based problems for people. Their office was located above the basement/office of Vortex Ventures, a company who makes it their business to try and steal Infinity Ltd's customers, usually without success. Ross Williams starred as Valerian J. Vortex, the inept owner of Vortex Ventures, with Ian Scott as Arthur Plankton, his long suffering assistant who often showed signs that he was smarter than Vortex gave him credit for. Plankton is often made to perform tasks he is not happy with, such as climbing the air conditioning duct in order to eavesdrop on Infinity Ltd. Infinity Ltd. are aware of Vortex and Plankton and consider them a minor annoyance, rather than a serious threat to their business.

Characters

Kris
Kristal, known as Kris to most people is one half of Infinity Limited. Although it's a fairly even partnership, she seems to get the final say and leaves the more physical tasks to Rick. If she sees Rick on a break, she assumes he's been slacking off while she's been away. Despite this, Kris and Rick are good friends, maybe even lovers, but being a kids show, this is not explicitly mentioned or shown. Kris appears to be in her early 20s.

Rick
Rick is slightly more sceptical of new ideas, taking some convincing from Kris before he's fully on board. Although he is a hard worker, he also likes his leisure time which makes Kris sometimes think he doesn't pull his weight. He leaves for unexplained reasons and is replaced by Rosco. Rick appears to be in his early 20s.

Rosco
Practical minded and handy at building things, Rosco doesn't come up with any scientific ideas, leaving that up to Kris. He replaces Rick as the other half of Infinity Limited. Rosco appears to be in his early 20s.

Vortex
Valerian J. Vortex is the owner of Vortex Ventures, rival company to Infinity Limited. Vortex is greedy, lazy, ignorant, and unscrupulous, but not as stupid as he first appears. He can grasp scientific concepts but lacks the patience to understand a concept fully. He can also invent many different types of machine, most of which are at least partially successful before developing a fatal flaw. He is a self describe genius, and often ignores the advice from his assistant Plankton which is usually correct. Most episodes feature his latest poorly thought out but imaginative get rich quick scheme. He is almost always seen wearing a blue suit and tie. He has a moustache and a bald patch and his remaining hair is styled upwards, reminiscent of the horn-like hairdo of the Pointy-haired Boss from the comic strip Dilbert. Vortex appears to be in his early to late 30s.

Plankton
Arthur Plankton is the long suffering assistant of Vortex. He is rarely called by his first name which is only mentioned in a couple of episodes. Where Vortex is intellectually lazy, Plankton is physically lazy, although his reluctant participation in the experimental phase of Vortex's plans could explain that. Plankton lacks Vortex's guile and generally wants to do right by people but is lead astray by Vortex. He is slightly smarter than Vortex and usually notices the flaws in Vortex's plans but is ignored by Vortex. Plankton usually wears blue jeans, a thin grey V-neck school jumper with yellow, maroon, yellow stripes around the neck, and a thin grey knee length jacket. Plankton appears to be in his late 20s to early 30s.

Relationships
It is hinted that Kris and Rick might be romantically involved. Their office also appears to be a house and it's unknown where they live when they're not working. In "The Generation Gap", Kris's mum is supposed to be coming for dinner which suggests that the office is in their home. In "Melting Moments", Kris hugs Rick's arm when she introduces him to her old school friend Lucy which makes them look like a couple. Also in "Melting Moments", Miss Abernathy appears enamoured of Vortex, even calling him by his first name, at least until his latest invention fails to live up to his promises. In "The Generation Gap", Plankton notices the librarian and seems very interested in her but is interrupted by Vortex before he can chat her up.

Episode Structure
Most episodes involve Infinity Limited being hired by a new client with a different problem. They will research several different methods and perform experiments to see which solutions work, and which solutions suit the client best. In about half of the episodes, Vortex will send Plankton to spy on Infinity Limited, usually by crawling up the air duct that connects their office in the basement with Infinity Limited's office upstairs. He will then try to sabotage Infinity Limited's plans while coming up with his own idea to present to the client. In the remainder of the episodes, Vortex will be doing something that just coincidentally is thematically related to the problem that Infinity Limited is solving. Vortex's plans inevitably fail in the end, and always by his own doing.

Vortex and Plankton's ignorance allows them to research the science behind the problem and explain it to each other, which is a device used to explain the scientific concept to the kids in the audience. This happens with Infinity Limited as well, with only one of the two characters understanding the concept and explaining it to the other, or alternatively, seeking expert advice where the expert explains it to both of them. Concepts are explained to other characters, not directly to the children in the audience, and later demonstrated on screen to make it engaging for the kids watching.

The series promotes critical thinking and demonstrates the difference between thorough investigation and leaping to conclusions. Many episodes discuss environmental issues as well as general scientific concepts.

Episodes

References

External links
 Infinity Limited at IMDb

Australian children's television series
Australian Broadcasting Corporation original programming
1982 Australian television series debuts
1984 Australian television series endings